The Church of the Immaculate Conception, popularly known as La Inmaculada, is a Roman Catholic parish church in Rivera, Uruguay.

The original parish was established in 1884 by bishop Inocencio María Yéregui.

The cleric Carlos Parteli was its pastor in the 1940s, before being appointed Bishop of Tacuarembó in 1960.

References

External links

Rivera
1884 establishments in Uruguay

Roman Catholic church buildings in Rivera Department
19th-century Roman Catholic church buildings in Uruguay